Platinum Collection is the second greatest hits album by Serbian singer, songwriter and producer Željko Joksimović. The album was released on 18 April 2007 and contains 16 platinum hits from Joksimović's career plus two new songs: "Nije do mene" and "Devojka". The single "Devojka" charted very well, and got on the first place in most countries from the former Yugoslavia where this album was actually released. In the album is included the song "Lane moje" too. With this song Željko represented Serbia and Montenegro in the Eurovision Song Contest 2004 and finished on the 2nd place.

Track listing
 "Nije do mene" (Није до мене)
 "Devojka" (Девојка)
 "Lane moje" (Лане моје)
 "Supermen" (feat. Dino Merlin) (Супермен)
 "Leđa o leđa" (Лећa о лећа)
 "Dukati" (Дукати)
 "Najmoje" (Најмоје)
 "Idi na put" (Иди на пут)
 "Habanera" (Хабанера)
 "Michelle" (Мишел)
 "Lutko moja" (Лутко моја)
 "Istina" (Истина)
 "Pesma sirena" (Песма сирена)
 "Balada" (Балада)
 "Brate moj" (Брате мој)
 "Zaboravljaš" (Заборављаш)
 "Završna pesma" (Завршна песма)
 "Nedam nikom da te dira" (Недам ником да те дира)

Release history

Željko Joksimović albums
2007 greatest hits albums